Maesil-cha or plum tea is a traditional Korean tea made from maesil (fresh plums), omae (smoked plums), or maesil-cheong (plum syrup).

Preparation 
Most commonly, maesil-cha is made by mixing maesil-cheong (plum syrup) with hot or cold water.

Sometimes, plum tea is made with plum extract, made by grating green plums, mixing it with small amount of water and juicing through hemp cloth, and sun-drying it. The extract is kept in a glass container in a cool area, and mixed with hot water to make tea.

Plum tea made with smoked plums are usually called omae-cha ("smoked plum tea").

See also 
 Maehwa-cha – plum blossom tea
 Maesil-ju – plum wine
 Suānméitāng – Chinese sour plum drink

References 

Herbal tea
Korean tea